Into the Sun is a 2015 album by five-time Grammy nominee and blues artist Robben Ford.

Track listing
 "Rose of Sharon"	  3:12  	
 "Day of the Planets"    3:29 	
 "Howlin' at the Moon" 	  3:47 	
 "Rainbow Cover" 	  3:12 	
 "Justified" (with Keb Mo & Robert Randolph)    4:06 	
 "Breath of Me" (with ZZ Ward) 	 4:52 	
 "High Heels and Throwing Things" (with Warren Haynes)    3:22	
 "Cause of War"    3:34 	
 "So Long 4 U" (with Sonny Landreth)    5:11 	
 "Same Train"     3:56 	
 "Stone Cold Heaven" (with Tyler Bryant)     3:47

Personnel
Robben Ford - guitar

References

Robben Ford albums
2015 albums